Roy Smith (born 19 March 1936) is an English former footballer who played as an outside right for Hereford United, West Ham United and Portsmouth.

Footballing career
Born in Rawalpindi, British India, to English parents, Smith played for Woodford youth team after his parents returned to the UK. As an amateur footballer he played for Hereford United before signing professionally for West Ham in 1955 and making his debut against Stoke City on 2 April 1956. Smith played only nine times in his West Ham career in all competitions, scoring one goal. At the end of the 1956-57 season his contract was not renewed by West Ham and he emigrated with his parents. He returned to the UK in the early 1960s, signing for Portsmouth in 1962.

References

1936 births
Living people
English footballers
Association football forwards
Hereford United F.C. players
West Ham United F.C. players
Portsmouth F.C. players
English Football League players
Footballers from Rawalpindi